Arena Coliseo is an indoor arena in Mexico City, Mexico located at República del Perú 77 in the Cuauhtémoc borough. The arena is primarily used for professional wrestling, or lucha libre, shows promoted by Consejo Mundial de Lucha Libre (CMLL). The building was completed in 1943, built by Salvador Lutteroth, founder and owner of CMLL and served as the main venue for CMLL from 1943 until 1953 when Arena México was completed and became the main venue for Lutteroth's promotion. It has a seating capacity of 5,250 when configured for professional wrestling or boxing events.

History

Professional wrestling promoter Salvador Lutteroth began promoting wrestling, or Lucha libre events in Arena Modelo in 1933 as he founded Empresa Mexicana de Lucha Libre (EMLL). The building served as the main venue for Lutteroth's promotion from 1933 until the early 1940s when the success of Lucha Libre meant that Arena Model was becoming too small to accommodate the weekly shows. Lutteroth financed the building of a new arena with $40,000 that he had won in the national lottery. The building would sit on the location of República del Perú 77 in the Cuauhtémoc and was designed by Architect Francisco Bullman. Upon its completion in 1943 it was the first sports building in Mexico to have built in Air Conditioning. The building would hold 8,863 spectators for wrestling or boxing events and quickly gained the nickname the "Lagunilla Funnel" due to the design of the spectators stands in regards to the ring in the middle. The event began hosting Boxing events only a few months after opening and for years would run both wrestling and boxing events throughout the year. The venue served as the main building for EMLL, hosting their Anniversary shows starting with their 10th Anniversary show in 1943 through their 22nd Anniversary show in 1955. From 1956 and forward Arena Coliseo became a secondary venue for EMLL, with the newly constructed Arena México taking over as the venue for all of EMLL's major shows. In 1979, for undisclosed reasons EMLL held their 46th Anniversary Show in Arena Coliseo instead of Arena México, marking the last major EMLL event held there. By the beginning of the 2000s EMLL, now renamed Consejo Mundial de Lucha Libre (CMLL) only held one weekly event, a Sunday Night show. The reduction in use is both as a result of the building's state, lack of parking and the general area being less secure with time due to rise in crime.

As a boxing venue
Arena Coliseo hosted its first boxing event only a month after opening, taking place on May 1, 1943. The event started a tradition of Monday night boxing event at Arena Coliseo that would remain long after Arena Mexico had taken over as CMLL's main venue. The first show was headlined by a fight between Mexican National Bantamweight champion Ernesto Aguilar and Leonardo Lopez. Over the years a number of Mexican and international boxing greats fought at Arena Coliseo, including but not limited to: Jose Medel, Butter Napoles, Vicente Saldivar, Toluco Lopez, Pajarito Moreno, Cuyo Hernandez, El Chango Casanova, Carlos Zarate, Lupe Pintor, Alexis Arguello Alfonso Zamora, Ricardo Lopez, Pipino Cuevas, Kid Azteca and Chiquita Gonzalez. Julio César Chávez fought at Arena Coliseo during his amateur days, but the main attraction of the Arena Coliseo boxing was Raul Macias, with his matches often being shown on the Televisa television channel.

Deaths on location
Over the years Arena Coliseo has witnessed the deaths of several wrestlers and boxers. The first death happened on March 21, 1946, during a boxing match. In the second round of a fight between veteran Guillermo Ramos and young wrestler Fernando Mendoza where Mendoza fell to the floor in the second round and never woke up after the knockout. On December 25, 1979, wrestler José Vincent Ramos Estrada, known to the wrestling world under the ring name Sangre India faced off against César Curiel. Curiel teamed up with El Vengador while Sangre India was teaming with Leo Lopez. During the match Curiel executed a drop kick, a move that was supposed to knock Sangre India out of the ring to the floor. During the fall to the floor, Estrada's head and neck struck the apron before he tumbled uncontrollably to the ground. Estrada died shortly after the fall. The third death to occur in Arena Coliseo was not as a result of a match, but a gunshot. On May 14, 1983 "Uncle" Jimenez, the manager of boxer James Casas was shot dead during Casas' victory celebration. A 100,000 pesos reward was offered at the time but no murderer was ever found. On October 26, 1993, professional wrestler Jesús Javier Hernández Silva, better known under the ring name Oro, teamed up La Fiera and Brazo de Plata to face the team of Kahoz, Dr. Wagner Jr. and Jaque Mate at an Arena Coliseo show. Before the match, while going over the plans for the match Oro said he wanted to take a "Kobashi bump" during the match, a reference to a head first backdrop driver which Kenta Kobashi took in a match in All Japan Pro Wrestling only a few months earlier. That particular bump had a dramatic effect, as it looked like Kobashi had broken his neck from the move and Oro wanted to use the shock effect to help build the drama for their match. During the match, Kahoz clotheslined Oro, who spun and landed on his head as he had planned. His opponent tried to pick him up, but soon thereafter he collapsed and his pulse became weak. Oro was put on a stretcher at the start of the second fall while his brother screamed, "Don't fall asleep!", warning him to remain alert so that he wouldn't lose consciousness. Oro died before being placed in an awaiting ambulance.

Significant events
Over the years Arena Coliseo has hosted a number of significant events, especially a large number of EMLL/CMLL events have taken place in Arena Colise, including a number of CMLL Anniversary shows, shows celebrating the anniversary of Arena Coliseo and shows headlined by major, important matches.

EMLL Anniversary Shows
EMLL 10th Anniversary Show
EMLL 11th Anniversary Show
EMLL 12th Anniversary Show
EMLL 13th Anniversary Show
EMLL 14th Anniversary Show
EMLL 15th Anniversary Show
EMLL 16th Anniversary Show
EMLL 17th Anniversary Show
EMLL 18th Anniversary Show
EMLL 19th Anniversary Show
EMLL 20th Anniversary Show
EMLL 21st Anniversary Show
EMLL 22nd Anniversary Show
EMLL 46th Anniversary Show

First Show

The first show in Arena Coliseo took place on April 2, 1943, before the show the Archbishop of Mexico, Luis M.  Martinez, gave the arena a Catholic blessing. The Mexico City council leader Javier Rojo Gomez was also in attendance for this major event. The show was originally slated to have Bill Longsan from Texas defend a version of the World Heavyweight Championship against Juan Humberto, but Humberto was not able to travel from the United States to Mexico City in time. Instead Lutteroth booked Mexican National Middleweight Champion Tarzán Lopez to defend his championship against Santo, who at the time was already a prominent figure in Lucha Libre, although not the icon he would later become through his lucha films and in-ring exploits.

50th Anniversary Show
The then-recently renamed CMLL celebrated the 50th Anniversary of Arena Coliseo with a wrestling show on April 4, 1993, centered around a Ruleta de la Muerte ("Roulette of death") tournament where the loser of each match would advance to the next round and the person who lost the final match would be forced to remove his wrestling mask and reveal his real name per lucha libre traditions.

70th Anniversary Show
On April 7, 2013, CMLL celebrated the 70th anniversary of Arena Coliseo with a show that featured a number of veteran wrestlers that did not usually work for CMLL such as Negro Navarro, Black Terry, Villano IV, Ray Mendoza Jr., Universo 2000, Máscara Año 2000 and Rayo de Jalisco Jr.  Before his match Ray Mendoza Jr. stated that his match in Arena Coliseo would be his last match, after having held a Retirement show a few weeks before. During the show CMLL gave an award to a fan who had also attended the first show 70 years prior.

75. Aniversario de Arena Coliseo

The 75. Aniversario de Arena Coliseo (Spanish for "Arena Coliseo's 75th Anniversary") show was a major professional wrestling show produced by Consejo Mundial de Lucha Libre (CMLL) to commemorate the opening of Arena Coliseo, in 1943. The event took place on April 7, 2018, and featured six matches in total, including a guest appearances from several leyendas who had previously worked for CMLL. The main event saw Atlantis and Blue Panther defeat leyendas Fuerza Guerrera and El Satánico

Results

Luchas de Apuestas

Unlike most sports or sports entertainment around the world Lucha Libre holds championships in less regards compared to the prestige of winning a Lucha de Apuesta, literally a "bet match". In a Lucha de Apuesta match each competitor "Bets" either their wrestling mask or hair on the outcome of the match and if they lose must unmask or have their hair shaved off in the ultimate form of humiliation. Since the mask holds a sacred place in Lucha Libre the most prestigious Apuesta is the mask, once it is lost a wrestler is not allowed to put the mask back on when wrestling. As part of the tradition an unmasked wrestler must also reveal their "true identity", which means give their birth name, age and wrestling experience as they lose the "anonymity" of the enmascarado character. Over the years Arena Coliseo has been host to a number of Luchas de Apuestas, including one that many consider the biggest Luchas de Apuestas match where Lucha Libre icon El Santo defeated and unmasked Black Shadow in 1952. Below is a list of all documented Luchas de Apuestas that have taken place in Arena Coliseo since its completion in 1943.

See also
CMLL Arena Coliseo Tag Team Championship

Footnotes

References

External links
Website of CMLL, the owners of the building

Indoor arenas in Mexico
Sports venues in Mexico City
Boxing venues in Mexico